"Soy Libre" (English: I'm Free) is a song by the Puerto Rican reggaetón recording artist Ivy Queen, from her ninth studio, Vendetta (2015). It was composed by Queen with Nelson Díaz, Jorge Guadalupe and O'Nell Lopez, and produced by DJ Nelson and O'Nell Flow.

It was released as the lead single from the album on 9 December 2014, simultaneously  with the other three singles "Vamos A Guerrear", "Nací Para Amarte" and "Vendetta" on the EP release Vendetta: First Round (2014).

Writing and composition
The merengue "Soy Libre", appears as the first track on the album EP release, track six on the urban album EP release and track twenty-two on the studio album release. It was composed in major key tonality and contains lead vocals performed by Queen and group back-up vocals. It has simple harmonic progressions, a brass-horn ensemble, prominent percussion, synthesizers, techno synths and accordion or bandoneon playing. The track was extensively produced by DJ Nelson and O'Nell Flow.

On the urban album EP release, David Jefferies selected "Soy Libre" along with "Sacude & Levantate", "Te Sirvo De Abrigo" and Naci Para Amarte" as the leading tracks, while naming "Vamos A Guerrear", "Vendetta", "Naci Para Amarte" and "Soy Libre" as the key tracks from the studio album release. Manero magazine's review of the album complimented Queen's "tropical zest" and claimed "Soy Libre" to be "passable".

Release and live performances
It was released to radio in October 2014. It was officially released as the lead single from the album on 9 December 2014, simultaneously with the other three singles "Vamos A Guerrear", "Nací Para Amarte" and "Vendetta" on the EP release Vendetta: First Round. The official music video was released on the video-sharing website YouTube on 13 January 2015. By November 2015, it had over one million views. It was directed by Florida Film House.

It was performed live on Telemundo's Raymond y Sus Amigos in January 2015. The song was performed live on Telemundo's El Nuevo Día in February 2015. The same month the song was also performed on Univision's ¡Despierta América!. It was also performed live on Univision's Te Desayuno Alegre.

Track listing

References

2014 singles
2014 songs
Ivy Queen songs
Spanish-language songs
Merengue songs
Songs written by Ivy Queen
Songs with feminist themes